Wayne Devlin (born 17 July 1944) is an Australian boxer. He competed at the 1972 Summer Olympics and the 1976 Summer Olympics. At the 1976 Summer Olympics, he lost in his opening fight to Robbie Davies of Great Britain.

References

External links
 

1944 births
Living people
Australian male boxers
Olympic boxers of Australia
Boxers at the 1972 Summer Olympics
Boxers at the 1976 Summer Olympics
Place of birth missing (living people)
Light-middleweight boxers